The Last of the Spartans is a sculpture by Italian and American artist Gaetano Trentanove displayed at the Milwaukee Art Museum in Milwaukee, Wisconsin. The white marble figurative sculpture depicts a fallen soldier. The depiction of the figure is highly detailed and realistic. The work was originally exhibited at the World's Columbian Exposition in 1893.

References

Culture of Milwaukee
1892 sculptures
Marble sculptures in Wisconsin